Guillaume Emmanuel "Guy-Manuel" de Homem-Christo (born 8 February 1974) is a French musician, record producer, singer, songwriter, DJ and composer. He is known as one half of the former French house music duo Daft Punk, along with Thomas Bangalter. He has also produced several works from his now defunct record label Crydamoure with label co-owner Éric Chedeville.

Early life
Homem-Christo was born on 8 February 1974 in Neuilly-sur-Seine. He is the great-grandson of Portuguese poet Homem Christo Filho, and the great-great-grandson of Portuguese military figure Francisco Manuel Homem Cristo, who was forced into exile in France in 1910. Homem-Christo was given a toy guitar and keyboard at around seven years of age. He was eventually given an electric guitar at age 14, and uses a guitar when writing music.

Career
Homem-Christo met Thomas Bangalter when they were attending the Lycée Carnot school together in 1987. It was there that they discovered their mutual fascination for films and music of the 1960s and '70s: "very basic cult teenager things, from Easy Rider to the Velvet Underground". The two and Laurent Brancowitz eventually joined to form an indie rock trio called Darlin', in which Homem-Christo performed guitar. Bangalter felt that "It was still maybe more a teenage thing at that time. It's like, you know, everybody wants to be in a band." A negative review referred to their music as "a daft punky thrash", which inspired Bangalter and Homem-Christo's new name. The two soon became interested in electronic dance music after going to a club in 1992. Homem-Christo is credited for designing the Daft Punk logo in the liner notes of Homework.

Regarding Daft Punk's creative process and working with Bangalter, Homem-Christo commented that "he's much more of the tech guy than I am. We did everything together. But I have more distance". He added, "I'm more critical of everything we do. We're two-halves of one solid combination. There's balance there – completeness between us, yeah".

Homem-Christo is also a co-founder of the group Le Knight Club, along with Éric Chedeville from Pumpking Records. They are the founders of the record label Crydamoure, named after a variation of the French phrase "cri d'amour" or "cry of love" in English. Crydamoure also published works by Homem-Christo's brother Paul de Homem-Christo, under the name Play Paul. In regards to Crydamoure, Homem-Christo stated:

He produced Sébastien Tellier's 2008 album titled Sexuality. In 2010, Homem-Christo worked with SebastiAn on the Kavinsky song "Nightcall". In 2012, he was featured on Tellier's album My God Is Blue on the track "My Poseidon."

Following the release of Daft Punk's fourth album Random Access Memories, Homem-Christo and Bangalter collaborated on two tracks with The Weeknd, "Starboy" and "I Feel It Coming," with the former gaining the duo their first number one on the Billboard Hot 100 and the latter, co-written by Chedeville of Le Knight Club, peaking at number four. Homem-Christo and Bangalter both contributed writing and production credits to the 2017 song "Overnight" by Parcels. This would be Daft Punk's final production work as a duo, as Daft Punk announced their split via YouTube in February of 2021.

Homem-Christo worked on the title track to Charlotte Gainsbourg's fifth studio album Rest, released in 2017. He also contributed to the 2018 song “Hurt You”, a collaboration with The Weeknd and Gesaffelstein.

In 2020, during the COVID-19 pandemic, Homem-Christo created a curated playlist called "Star of a hero" for Italian brand MEDEA, containing tracks from the The Beach Boys, The Weeknd, George Duke, and Thundercat, among others.

On 22 February 2021, Daft Punk released a video announcing their breakup. Friend and collaborator Todd Edwards later clarified that Bangalter and Homem-Christo remain active separately.

Personal life
Homem-Christo has two children: a daughter and a son. He and his wife divorced in 2010.

Both Homem-Christo and Bangalter have no interest in being celebrities or discussing their private lives. In the rare events of interviews, Bangalter did the majority of talking to journalists. With regard to working and collaborating with other artists, Homem-Christo sees it as a matter of timing and creativity, rather than fame and opportunity. He once stated in an interview:

Discography

Production credits

Albums
 Waves (2000)
 Waves II (2003)
 Sexuality by Sébastien Tellier (2008)

Tracks

References

External links
 

1974 births
Daft Punk members
Darlin' (French band) members
French people of Portuguese descent
French pop guitarists
French male guitarists
Living people
Chevaliers of the Ordre des Arts et des Lettres
Lycée Carnot alumni
French disco singers
Grammy Award winners
Electronic dance music DJs